Séamus Murphy (born 1938 in Camp, County Kerry) is an Irish former sportsperson. He played Gaelic football with his local club Lispole and was a member of the Kerry senior inter-county team from 1958 until 1971.

References

1938 births
Living people
Lispole Gaelic footballers
Kerry inter-county Gaelic footballers
Munster inter-provincial Gaelic footballers